The 1973 Tour de Suisse was the 37th edition of the Tour de Suisse cycle race and was held from 15 June to 23 June 1973. The race started in Zürich and finished in Olten. The race was won by José Manuel Fuente of the Kas team.

General classification

References

1973
Tour de Suisse
June 1973 sports events in Europe